Events from the year 2013 in Argentina

Incumbents
 President: Cristina Fernández de Kirchner
 Vice president: Amado Boudou

Governors
Governor of Buenos Aires Province: Daniel Scioli 
Governor of Catamarca Province: Lucía Corpacci 
Governor of Chaco Province: Jorge Capitanich (until 20 November); Juan Carlos Bacileff Ivanoff (starting 20 November)
Governor of Chubut Province: Martín Buzzi 
Governor of Córdoba: José Manuel De la Sota 
Governor of Corrientes Province: Ricardo Colombi 
Governor of Entre Ríos Province: Sergio Urribarri 
Governor of Formosa Province: Gildo Insfrán
Governor of Jujuy Province: Eduardo Fellner 
Governor of La Pampa Province: Óscar Jorge 
Governor of La Rioja Province: Luis Beder Herrera 
Governor of Mendoza Province: Francisco Pérez 
Governor of Misiones Province: Maurice Closs 
Governor of Neuquén Province: Jorge Sapag 
Governor of Río Negro Province: Alberto Weretilneck 
Governor of Salta Province: Juan Manuel Urtubey 
Governor of San Juan Province: José Luis Gioja 
Governor of San Luis Province: Claudio Poggi 
Governor of Santa Cruz Province: Daniel Peralta 
Governor of Santa Fe Province: Antonio Bonfatti 
Governor of Santiago del Estero: Gerardo Zamora (until 10 December); Claudia Ledesma Abdala (starting 23 December)
Governor of Tierra del Fuego: Fabiana Ríos 
Governor of Tucumán: José Alperovich

Vice Governors
Vice Governor of Buenos Aires Province: Gabriel Mariotto 
Vice Governor of Catamarca Province: Dalmacio Mera 
Vice Governor of Chaco Province: Juan Carlos Bacileff Ivanoff (until 20 November); vacant thereafter (starting 20 November)
Vice Governor of Corrientes Province: Gustavo Canteros 
Vice Governor of Entre Rios Province: José Orlando Cáceres 
Vice Governor of Formosa Province: Floro Bogado 
Vice Governor of Jujuy Province: Guillermo Jenefes 
Vice Governor of La Pampa Province: Norma Durango 
Vice Governor of La Rioja Province: Sergio Casas 
Vice Governor of Misiones Province: Hugo Passalacqua 
Vice Governor of Neuquén Province: Ana Pechen 
Vice Governor of Rio Negro Province: Carlos Peralta 
Vice Governor of Salta Province: Andrés Zottos 
Vice Governor of San Juan Province: Sergio Uñac 
Vice Governor of San Luis Province: Jorge Raúl Díaz 
Vice Governor of Santa Cruz: Fernando Cotillo 
Vice Governor of Santa Fe Province: Jorge Henn 
Vice Governor of Santiago del Estero: Ángel Niccolai (until 10 December); José Emilio Neder (starting 10 December)
Vice Governor of Tierra del Fuego: Roberto Crocianelli

Events
13 March – Jorge Bergoglio is elected the 266th pope
2–3 April – Flash floods in the Buenos Aires Province kill over 80 people.
18 April – The cacerolazo 18A takes place, attended by over 1.5 million people.
13 June – Two trains collide, killing at least three and injuring 315 people.

Deaths
24 March – Susana Viau, journalist (b. 1944)
17 May – Jorge Rafael Videla, President of Argentina (b. 1925)
15 June – José Froilán González, racing driver (b. 1922)
21 June – Ed Iacobucci, Citrix Systems co-founder (b. 1953)

See also

Argentine legislative election, 2013
List of Argentine films of 2013
The road of the money K

References

External links

 
Years of the 21st century in Argentina